Lillian Louisa Britten (1886-1952) was a South African botanist considered the leading expert of Eastern Cape flora in her time. Britten studied at Rhodes University College in Grahamstown as a student of Selmar Schonland, and after studying in the UK, returned in 1918 to Grahamstown to be a lecturer in botany at the Rhodes University College.

References 

1886 births
1952 deaths
20th-century South African women scientists
20th-century South African botanists
South African women botanists
South African expatriates in the United Kingdom